David Scott Patchen is an American glass artist who uses the techniques of cane and murrine in an American style.  (Cane are colored and patterned glass rods, murrine are patterned cross-sections of glass 'tiles'.)  Patchen's work is known primarily for a combination of complexity and scale in densely patterned glass.  His work is in many private and public collections internationally, featured in many publications and frequently in juried shows such as SOFA (Sculpture, Objects and Functional Art), Chicago, ART Shanghai and ART Palm Beach.  His work is shown in galleries in the U.S., Canada and Europe.  Patchen was awarded an artist residency in 2010 in Seto city, Japan where his visit was covered by the local media and included lectures, demonstrations and a show of his work at the Seto City Art Museum.  His work has won awards and is in both private and public collections internationally.  Based on Patchen's expertise, his book is part of the permanent collection of Giorgio Cini Foundation's Centro Studi del Vetro (Glass Study Center) library in Venice, Italy and the Rakow Library at the Corning Museum of Glass.

Most significantly, his work was featured in a cover article in Glass Art Magazine in the Mar/Apr 2016 issue.  He has demonstrated publicly including at the Glass Art Society's international conference in 2015 and as Guest Artist at the Corning Museum of Glass in 2017.

Born in New Rochelle, New York, Patchen resides in San Francisco, California. Primarily self-taught since 2001, he works out of Public Glass in San Francisco. Informal education included visits to the studio of Afro Celotto, maestro and former assistant to Lino Tagliapietra in Murano, Italy, and an artistic merit scholarship to the Pilchuck Glass School. Early in his career, Patchen assisted several artists including Afro Celotto and Marvin Lipofsky in creating their work.

About his work
Patchen's series include forms titled "Resistenza", "Foglio", "Parabola", "Allegro", "Bloom", "Piscine", "Ellipse" and "Spheres" which are created in murrine and/or cane.

Patchen is involved in the glass arts community in San Francisco as Chairman Emeritus of the Board of Directors at Public Glass  and is a former member of the Board of Directors, Glass Alliance of Northern California.

Gallery

See also
Caneworking
Glass art
Glassblowing
Murrine

References

External links

Nashville Arts Magazine: Frozen Fire: Glass Art of David Patchen, October 2012
The Bold Italic
American Craft Magazine; One Artist's Evolving Style
Encore! Encore! Gallery at Vienna International Art & Antiques Fair, Vienna
Murrine Mystique Show
Glass Art Society
Sandra Ainsley Gallery
San Francisco ArtSpan
SF Station Announcement
Liberty Museum

1966 births
Artists from New Rochelle, New York
Living people
American glass artists
Artists from California